The 2001 Sun Belt Conference men's basketball tournament was held March 2–6 at the Mitchell Center at the University of South Alabama in Mobile, Alabama.

Top-seeded Western Kentucky defeated hosts   in the championship game, 64–54, to win their third Sun Belt men's basketball tournament.

The Hilltoppers, in turn, received an automatic bid to the 2001 NCAA tournament. No other Sun Belt members earned bids to the tournament.

Format
The Sun Belt added three new teams prior to the 2000–01 season: Middle Tennessee State (Ohio Valley), New Mexico State (Big West), and North Texas (Big West). The conference's total membership increased to twelve.

The tournament field expanded once again, increasing from nine to eleven teams (NMSU did not compete). With all eleven participating Sun Belt members seeded based on regular season conference records, the five highest-seeded teams were awarded byes into the quarterfinal round while the six lowest-seeded teams entered the bracket in the preliminary first round.

Bracket

See also
Sun Belt Conference women's basketball tournament

References

Sun Belt Conference men's basketball tournament
2000–01 Sun Belt Conference men's basketball season
Sun Belt Conference men's basketball tournament
Sun Belt Conference men's basketball tournament